Cocoroco is an alcohol product from Bolivia notable for its high purity of 96%. Technically a rectified spirit, cocoroco is sold as "potable alcohol", most often in tin cans. 

Like rum, cocoroco is made from sugar cane. Unlawful trade of cocoroco and coca leaves occurs across the Altiplano among Aymara communities living in Chile and Bolivia. Cocoroco is illegal in some neighboring countries such as Chile where all alcoholic drinks with over 55% alcohol content by volume are illegal.

Notable brands of cocoroco include Caiman and Ceibo.

See also
Cachaça, a typical Brazilian alcoholic beverage
Fernet, a typical Italian and Argentine alcoholic beverage
Pisco, a typical Peruvian and Chilean alcoholic beverage
Singani, a typical Bolivian alcoholic beverage
Toxicity of alcohol

References

Bolivian alcoholic drinks
Alcohol